Milan Čvirk (14 September 1976 – 2 December 1997) was a Slovak professional football player.

Club career
He made his senior debut for 1. FC Košice in the 1994/95 season and went on to win the 1996–97 Slovak Superliga with them, qualifying for the 1997–98 UEFA Champions League.

Death
Čvirk died on 2 December 1997 in a car crash, in which his teammate Albert Rusnák suffered fractures to both legs. It was reported that the vehicle had slipped in bad weather conditions and hit a street light, instantly killing the young midfielder. The crash also ended the playing career of Rusnák, who was driving the car.

When Košice played Feyenoord in the Champions League a week later, Čvirk's shirt was held up during the taking of the squad's photo. Also, Feyenoord's players wore black armbands during the match in memory of Čvirk.

References

1976 births
1997 deaths
Association football midfielders
Slovak footballers
FC VSS Košice players
Slovak Super Liga players
Road incident deaths in Slovakia